A velocity stack,  'trumpet, or air horn', is a trumpet-shaped device of differing lengths which is fitted to the air entry of an engine's intake system, carburetor or fuel injection. 

It is unrelated to the noise maker or signaling air horn.

Function

The velocity stack is designed to:
 Allow smooth and even entry of air at high velocities into the intake tract with the flow stream adhering to the pipe walls known as laminar flow.
 Modify the dynamic tuning range of the intake tract by functioning as a resonating pipe which can adjust the frequency of pressure pulses based on its length within the tract.

Modified engines often have the original air box and associated ducting removed and velocity stacks are installed as accessories.

The length of the stack is known to have a direct effect on a particular engine's boosted power range.

Most current aftermarket stacks are designed to be run "in" the airbox and a company that does research well will have some applications that have all the same length and some applications that have differing lengths of stacks on different cylinders.

It is commonly related that "stand off" (air–fuel mix that gets pushed back out of the port, usually at full throttle / low rpm) is somehow captured by installing a longer intake pipe (stack). However, it is actually that the intake valve is closing too late and the combustion chamber is simply overfilling and blowing back out the intake port, before the intake valve closes. A longer inlet pipe will create a later intake pressure wave that will help keep the air in the chamber until the intake valve closes.

The acceleration of air flow into a duct is inherently a highly efficient process and the difference between even the crudest radius inlet, and the most aerodynamic shape possible is slight, amounting to no more than a few percent.  The flow coefficient of a perfect entry would be 1.0 while the coefficient for a sharp edged entry would be 0.6 and a re-entrant plain pipe 0.5.  In practice these latter types of entry are never used for engine intakes. There is always some attempt to provide some radius at the entry. This means that total engine airflow would not increase by the amount suggested by these figures, which apply only to the entry alone, as the inlet end is never the smallest or most restrictive part of the system. Because the greatest losses to flow occur near the valve seat, actual overall gain from any improvement of the entry flow would be much less.

In the real world, on high-rpm IR IC engine, using a minimum amount of inlet radius gives the best wave strength and a power boost of 2% to 4% over a 3000 to 3500 rpm range.
Using a larger radius, like 3/4", broadens out the resonant pressure wave rpm range, but the compression boosting pressure wave is greatly diminished and almost unnoticed by the engine.

See also
 Stuart Hilborn – fuel injection pioneer

References

Engine fuel system technology